Chongxian Township is a township in Xinfeng County, Jiangxi, China. , it administers Chongxian Residential Neighborhood and the following fourteen villages:
Chongxian Village
Yuankeng Village
Luotang Village
Zhaixia Village
Shankeng Village
Shanba Village
Xishui Village
Jingtou Village
Dongshui Village
Laolong Village
Yinqiao Village
Qiaotou Village
Denggang Village
Bushe Village

References 

Township-level divisions of Jiangxi
Xinfeng County, Jiangxi